Laxbach is a short river of Hesse, Germany. It is formed in Hirschhorn at the confluence of the rivers Ulfenbach and Finkenbach. After 0.7 km it discharges into the Neckar.

See also

List of rivers of Hesse

References

Rivers of Hesse
Rivers of Germany